You Got Me or U Got Me may refer to:

Film
You Got Me! (film), a 2007 Filipino comedy

Music

Songs
"You Got Me" (The Roots song), 1999
"You Got Me" (J.Williams song), 2010
"You Got Me" (Ivy Quainoo song), 2012
"You Got Me" (Mýa song), 2018
"U Got Me", a song by B5
"You Got Me", a song by Tommy James in 1980
"You Got Me", a song by Mariah Carey from Charmbracelet
"You Got Me", a song by One Block Radius
"You Got Me", a song by Toto from The Seventh One
"You Got Me", a song by Colbie Caillat from Breakthrough
"You Got Me", a song by Crash Kings from Crash Kings
"You Got Me", a song by Keke Palmer
"You Got Me", a song by Dave Alvin from Romeo's Escape
"U Got Me", a song by T-Pain from Rappa Ternt Sanga